The Second Adventure is the third album by the Los Angeles, California-based R&B group Dynasty (band).

Reception

Released in 1981, Produced by group member Leon Sylvers III.

Track listing
"Here I Am" (Nidra Beard, Belinda Lipscomb, Melvin Gentry, William Shelby) 	5:04
"Pain Got a Hold on Me" (Dana Meyers, William Shelby, Kevin Spencer)	3:43
"A Man in Love" (William Shelby, Stephen Shockley) 	4:13
"Give Your Love to Me" (Nidra Beard, William Shelby, Kevin Spencer) 	4:41
"You're My Angel" (Renwick Jackson) 	3:33
"Love in the Fast Lane" (Nidra Beard, William Shelby, Kevin Spencer) 	4:51
"Revenge" (Nidra Beard)	4:10
"Give It Up for Love"  (Nidra Beard, Potts, William Shelby) 	4:14
"High Time (I Left You Baby)" 	(Dana Meyers, Kevin Spencer) 	3:47
"That Lovin' Feeling" 	(Earnest Reed) 	4:24

Personnel
Kevin Spencer, Linda Carriere, Nidra Beard, Leon Sylvers III  - Lead Vocals
Leon Sylvers III, Foster Sylvers, Kenneth Gant - Bass
William Shelby - Piano, Drums, Vocals
Kevin Spencer - Drums, Piano, Clavinet 
Bo Watson - Fender Rhodes Electric Piano
Joey Gallo, Patricia Sylvers, Michael Nash  - Synthesizer
Ricky Smith - Synthesizer, Fender Rhodes Electric Piano
Ernest "Pepper" Reed, Melvin Gentry, Richard Randolph, Stephen Shockley - Guitar
Kenny Hudson, Wayne Milstein - Percussion

Charts

Singles

References

External links
 Dynasty-The Second Adventure at Discogs

1981 albums
Dynasty (band) albums
SOLAR Records albums
Albums produced by Leon Sylvers III